Red Eagle FC is an association football club in Cambodia. It plays in the Cambodian League the top division of Cambodian football.

Football clubs in Cambodia